Adrian Sprott (born 23 March 1962) is a Scottish former footballer, who played for Meadowbank, Hamilton and Stenhousemuir.

Sprott played for Hamilton in the Scottish Premier Division as a semi-professional player, as he combined his football career with working for Lothian & Borders Police. During that period, Sprott scored a goal that knocked Rangers out of the Scottish Cup in a famous cup upset. It also ended a British record period of Rangers goalkeeper Chris Woods not conceding a goal.
Sprott still works for what is now Police Scotland.

Honours

Player
Stenhousemuir
Scottish Challenge Cup 1995–96

References

External links 

1962 births
Living people
Footballers from Edinburgh
Association football wingers
Association football fullbacks
Scottish footballers
Livingston F.C. players
Hamilton Academical F.C. players
Stenhousemuir F.C. players
Scottish Football League players